Elvire Gertosio (born 20 May 1948, died between 1972 and 1976) was a French gymnast. She competed at the 1972 Summer Olympics.

References

External links
 

1948 births
1970s deaths
French female artistic gymnasts
Olympic gymnasts of France
Gymnasts at the 1972 Summer Olympics
Place of birth missing